Gina Cass-Gottlieb is the current chair of the Australian Competition & Consumer Commission.

Career
Cass-Gottlieb practiced law at Blake Dawson Waldron, rising to partner. She was a senior and founding partner of the Competition and Regulation Group at Gilbert + Tobin from the early 1990s to March 2022. She became a member of the Reserve Bank of Australia's Payments System Board in 2013 and the Financial Regulator Assessment Authority in September 2021.

On 21 March 2022, she became the chair of the Australian Competition & Consumer Commission and is the first woman to hold the position. Her appointment drew criticism from former prime minister Kevin Rudd for her connections to News Corp and the Murdoch family.

Education

Cass-Gottlieb holds a Bachelor of Laws and Bachelor of Economics from the University of Sydney, and was a Fulbright Scholar at University of California, Berkeley from 1986 to 1987, graduating with a Master of Laws, majoring in US competition law, financial institutions regulation and securities regulation.

Personal life 
Cass-Gottlieb's father, Cecil Cass, was an orthopedic surgeon and her mother, Bettina, is a sociologist and women’s rights activist. Her uncle Moss Cass was a doctor, the first minister for the environment in the Whitlam government and minister for media. Cass-Gottlieb married Stephen Gottlieb in February 1984.

References

Australian public servants
UC Berkeley School of Law alumni
Living people
Year of birth missing (living people)